The many-colored Chaco finch (Saltatricula multicolor) is a songbird found in or near dry woodland in south-central South America in Argentina, Bolivia, Uruguay and Paraguay. Evidence suggests it is a finch-like tanager.

Description 

Saltatricula multicolor is a large and attractive finch, common in the Gran Chaco where it is a frequent member of the mixed ground-feeding, seed-eating flocks that gather in winter. 

This species yellow bill and distinctive head pattern is often mistaken for the Golden-billed Saltator which occurs alongside him, but the Saltator is much bigger, duller and lacks any white on the tail.  

These birds are often seen in pairs or parties of five or six on the ground among low bushes, in burns, or at the borders of fields or thickets. Their light coloration makes them conspicuous. When startled they will fly into the bushes for safety. Their call is an insistent chipping note like that of a junco.

Males have dark mouse gray maxilla; cutting edge of maxilla and mandible mustard yellow; iris natal brown; tarsus and toes neutral gray. Juveniles has dull black bills with cutting edges faintly marked with dull yellow.

Length: 18 cm; Weight :25 g.

References

 Klicka, J.; Burns, K.; & Spellman, G. M. (2007). Defining a monophyletic Cardinalini: A molecular perspective. Molecular Phylogenetics and Evolution 45(3): 1014–1032.

many-colored Chaco finch
Birds of the Gran Chaco
many-colored Chaco finch
Tanagers
Taxobox binomials not recognized by IUCN